Longueira is a village in the southcentral part of the island of Santiago, Cape Verde. In 2010 its population was 326. Longueira is located 4 km southwest of João Teves and 1.5 km west of São Jorge. Monte Tchota, the highest point of the mountains of Rui Vaz, lies to the south.

References

Villages and settlements in Santiago, Cape Verde
São Lourenço dos Órgãos